Ariane Claire Burgess (born 20 November 1965) is a Scottish politician who has been a Member of the Scottish Parliament (MSP) for Highlands and Islands since 2021. A member of the Scottish Greens, she has served as the Scottish Parliament's Convener of the Local Government, Housing and Planning Committee since 2021.

Early life and education 
Arianne Claire Burgess was born in Edinburgh, Scotland. She studied at Kingston University from 1983 to 1984, completing a Art & Design Foundation course. After university, she attended the Wimbledon School of Art until 1987, earning a BA (Hons).

Burgess has a Master of Science degree in Integrative EcoSocial Design and Leadership through the Gaia University.   She was a facilitator for the Gaia Education's Ecovillage Design Education in Thailand and Findhorn Ecovillage from 2008 to 2019 and an adviser to Gaia University from 2012 to 2016. Burgess has a Certificate in Permaculture Design (New York Open Center 2007).

Political career
At the 2019 United Kingdom general election, Burgess stood as the Green candidate in Inverness, Nairn, Badenoch and Strathspey. She finished in fifth place.

Burgess was one of the twelve Scottish Greens running as a candidate for a constituency in the 2021 Scottish Parliament election. She contested in the Inverness and Nairn constituency, but failed to win, coming fourth. Although she lost, Burgess was elected as an additional Member of the Scottish Parliament (MSP) for Highlands and Islands region.

Personal life 
Burgess lives in Forres, Moray, in the north of Scotland. Her brother Steve Burgess is a Green councillor in the City of Edinburgh for the Southside / Newington ward.

Books 
Burgess is author of Life Design for Women: Conscious Living as a Force for Positive Change, an imprint of Findhorn Press published on 11 February 2020.

References

External links
 
 Personal website

Year of birth missing (living people)
Living people
Members of the Scottish Parliament 2021–2026
Scottish Green Party MSPs
Female members of the Scottish Parliament